The municipal police of Switzerland are a series of separate forces maintained by the municipalities of each canton. There are between 100 and 300 municipal police forces (therefore only approximately one-in-ten municipalities have their own police). Most of these forces are responsible for general law and order and parking enforcement only. In some larger cities, the municipal police also carry out traffic control and in Zurich, Winterthur and Lausanne they provide a full policing service. Municipal police forces send their recruits to the same regional police academies as the cantons do. 

For advanced training, the municipalities send their officers to the courses of the Swiss Police Institute.

Police Reforms

Canton of Aargau : At the beginning of the new millennium, the government formed Aargau regional police forces, in the center of each former city police forces are: Wettingen, Baden, Aarau, Lenzburg and Zofingen. In addition, the new Frick valley.

Canton of Bern : A referendum of 11 March 2007 decided the Bernese people, on the first January 2008 to integrate the city police to Bern cantonal police forces. All municipal corps should be united to the year 2011 in the Canton of Bern in Bern Police Unit Police (Police of the Canton of Bern).

Canton Grisons : In large-scale, highly compartmentalized Canton municipal autonomy is of high importance and so also within the cantonal police jurisdiction. Grisons City police: Chur (Coire), St. Moritz and Arosa.

Canton of Solothurn : Since 2005, the demand employed by a government unit of the police. This idea was abandoned in 2009, the city did not want to give up their police powers. As of January 2010, the Solothurn cantonal police leadership is indeed streamlined the municipal police corps Solothurn, Grenchen and Olten persist.

Canton Ticino (Ticino): Lugano, Locarno, Bellinzona and several municipalities have their own Corps.

Canton of Neuchâtel (Neuchâtel): The city police Neuchâtel to be integrated into the 2014 cantonal police forces, as has already happened with the City Corps of Le Locle and La Chaux-de-Fonds.

Canton of Vaud (Vaud): The Vaud vote for the creation of a police unit of 27 September 2009 failed: The cantonal police within federalism is indeed reorganized, the municipal police powers, however, remain largely intact. The most important corps leads the Lausanne . More Vaud police corps are the City of Yverdon, Montreux Morges......

Canton Wallis (Valais): In dissected mountain canton, there are numerous communal police. Urban Corps are Sion (Sion), Martigny (Martigny), Sierre (Sierre) and Brig

Canton of Zurich : 2001, voters rejected the establishment of a police unit. Since then, in addition to the Kantonspolizei Zürich essentially act the Stadtpolizei Zürich, the Zürich City Police, and the city police Winterthur in accordance with the Police Organization Act of 2006. In addition, around forty other municipal and local police forces, including about that of working -examination on their local jurisdictions.

The exact number of constituted Swiss city and municipal police forces can not be named, are different to the rules and organizations. But the fact is that the Swiss Association Municipal Police about one hundred members.

Gallery

See also
Municipal police

References

External links

 Website Schweizerische Vereinigung städtischer Polizeichefs/Swiss Association Municipal Police Chiefs association
 Konferenz Kantonaler Polizeikommandanten der Schweiz/Conference of Cantonal Police Commanders of Switzerland Website

Municipal law enforcement agencies